The Central District of Kaleybar County is in East Azerbaijan province, Iran. At the National Census in 2006, its population was 27,676 in 6,450 households. The following census in 2011 counted 26,652 people in 7,261 households. At the latest census in 2016, the district had 24,297 inhabitants in 7,832 households.

References 

Kaleybar County

Districts of East Azerbaijan Province

Populated places in East Azerbaijan Province

Populated places in Kaleybar County